Go Superlambananas! was an art exhibition that took place in Liverpool, England, during the city's European Capital of Culture celebrations in 2008. Based upon Taro Chiezo's Superlambanana, which had been located in Liverpool since 1998, the exhibit consisted of 124 two metre high replicas, which were located throughout Liverpool and the surrounding areas. Each mini-Superlambanana was individually designed by local community groups and artists, with a range of public and private sector organisations providing sponsorship funding. The mini-Superlambananas were on display for ten weeks, from June to August 2008.

Background

The Go Superlambananas! art exhibition was developed and based upon the Superlambanana sculpture that has been located in Liverpool since 1998. Designed by Manhattan-based Japanese artist Taro Chiezo for the 1998 ArtTransPennine Exhibition, the sculpture is a cross between a banana and a lamb. Superlambanana's design is also heavily influenced by the history of Liverpool itself, as historically both sheep and bananas were common cargos in the city's docks. The original sculpture weighs almost eight tons and stands 17 feet tall. Throughout its history the sculpture has been located at various areas throughout the city and on occasions even further afield. It currently stands on Tithebarn Street, outside the Liverpool John Moores University Avril Robarts Library/Learning Resource Centre.

History
The Go Superlambananas! exhibition was developed by the Liverpool Culture Company (LCC), led by its Creative Director Phil Redmond, in partnership with the Wild In Art. As part of the city's Capital of Culture celebrations, the LCC were eager to develop a cultural event in which local people could be involved not just in its consumption, but also its production. The eventual idea settled on, was to build upon the Superlambanana artwork, which had over time come to be recognised as a symbol of Liverpool in itself. As a result, 124 mini-SuperLambananas were created, each of which acted as a blank slate, on which various groups throughout the city could develop and design their own cultural contribution the city's celebrations.

Auction
At the end of their ten-week run, the mini Superlambananas were auctioned off for the Lord Mayor's charities, with each having a guide price ranging from £3,000 to £8,000. The first of two auctions was held at St George's Hall on the 9 September 2008 with 68 Superlambananas up for sale. In total they sold for £550,000 or approximately £7,800 each, well above estimates. The highest bid on the night was £25,000, paid by the Chairman of National Museums Liverpool for 'Mandy' Mandala Superlambanana, designed and created by Cheshire artist Patricia Lee, whilst Phil Redmond, creative director of the Liverpool Culture Company, purchased four lots for a total of £55,000. Other notable purchasers included comedian John Bishop, playwright Fred Lawless and Big Brother star Craig Phillips.  A second, internet-based auction took place on 16 September 2008 with 25% of the proceeds going to charity.

Exhibits
124 replica superlambananas were created as part of the exhibition. Each one was designed and sponsored by different organisations and subsequently located throughout the city and in some instances further afield.

Liverpool City Centre

North Liverpool

South Liverpool

Rest of Merseyside

Outside Merseyside

See also 
CowParade
Larkin 25

References
Notes

Bibliography

External links
Go Superlambananas! Official Site
Liverpool 08 Website
Liverpool 08 Website
BBC - Superlambanana donated to museum September 2008

Culture in Liverpool
Painted statue public art